Nata is a small village in the Paphos area of southwest Cyprus. It is a small relatively unspoilt traditional village situated on the south-eastern hillside of the Xeros River Valley with approximately 300 residents that is slowly growing due to the number of foreigners wanting to live there. The valley is green in winter but brown in summer.

It has views to the Mediterranean Sea and Troodos Mountains. It is approx 20 minutes from the centre of the town of Paphos and about 10 minutes to the sea. There is an international airport approx 15 minutes from Nata.

The biggest dam in Paphos starts at Nata and supplies water to the majority of Paphos District which has a population of 76,100.

The village has a traditional village restaurant known as Perikli's tavern and about 4 traditional cafes.

It has numerous festivities during the year especially during mid-August for Panagias (Greek: Παναγία) day which are festivities relating to the Virgin Mary. It has a beautiful church called St. Nicholas (Agios Nikolaos) in the centre of the village and another church under renovation built around the 14th century which is heritage listed.

Many persons left the village in the 1950s and 1960s when conditions were harsh and little opportunity existed. Most moved to Australia mainly to Melbourne and Perth. Some went to Germany, England, South Africa and Canada where they have prospered and educated their children who greatly contributed to the development of their adopted countries.

References

Communities in Paphos District